Dževad Galijašević is a Bosnian political analyst and self-professed counter-terrorism expert.

Biography 
Born in Moševac near Maglaj, Galijašević became a member of the League of Communists of Yugoslavia in his youth.

Since 1986, there was a conflict between Moševac and the Bosnian political leadership. In the election for leadership in the local community of Moševac, Dževad Galijašević and Hasan Delić had the most votes, however, the leadership in Maglaj opposed such a decision deeming that they were not morally and politically suitable, and they were thus never instated. Galijašević, a Moševac community leader, spoke at a public meeting regarding human rights and liberties in BiH, seeking support in his struggle against local leaders in Maglaj. He was arrested after the meeting and served seven months in prison. He started a hunger strike in prison, and human rights organization demanded his pardon. The Presidency of BiH pardoned him on 27 January 1989, after his mother had signed a petition asking for his release. Hasan Delić was arrested in May 1989.

During the Bosnian War, Galijašević joined the Army of the Republic of Bosnia and Herzegovina and was an officer of the 3rd Corps. Bosnian minister Dragan Mektić has shown a photograph in which Galijašević reports to Alija Izetbegović and Sakib Mahmuljin in the village of Gostovići. According to Galijašević, Al-Qaeda leader Ayman al-Zawahiri, who made several trips to Bosnia, visited the Maglaj area as early as September 1992.

In 1999, he was appointed the Maglaj president of the Party for Bosnia and Herzegovina. In 2000 he was the mayor of Maglaj municipality. As mayor, he ordered for the 1,500 Bosnian mujahideen occupying Serb homes in Gornja Bocinja to be vacated, which led him to be hated by the Bosnian mujahideen. The order was never carried out, however. In September 2006 he had been attacked twice and was forced to relocate his family to Croatia. In late November 2006 he stated that Izetbegović-ally Haris Silajdžić "was the organizer and sponsor of mujahedin coming into Bosnia." In 2007, he was the head of the municipal administration of Maglaj.

Since the mid-2000s, Galijašević has re-branded himself as a "counter-terrorism" and "foreign affairs" expert although he is considered by large segments of the Bosnian public as little more than surrogate of the Serb nationalist government of Milorad Dodik in Banja Luka. In 2015, Bosnian media published evidence that Galijašević was on permanent retainer by the Dodik government.

In 2010, his fifteen-year-old son was beaten by a 52-year-old man because of his "father working for Chetniks (Serbs)". He has stated that Bosnia and Herzegovina is the most dangerous point in Europe from the point of jihadist terrorist threat.

Criticism 
He was labeled by Dragan Mektić, Minister of Security of Bosnia and Herzegovina, as "quasi-expert and warmonger". He and the RTRS were fined at the Konjic Municipal Court for presenting inaccurate information about Adnan Dlakić, an official at the Ministry of Security of Bosnia and Herzegovina who was accused by Galijašević of being a former member of the Bosnian mujaheddin detachment when in fact he joined Army only in 2002. Galijašević has repeatedly made claims that were described as conspiracy theories from which the media then make "news". He placed several stories that were later found as fake and fabrications. Fact checking platform Raskrinkavanje summariased that Galijašević was known for presenting "unverified and false facts". In an interview for Balkan Info he claimed that COVID-19 pandemic was a "terrorist concept".

Works
Hrvatska kriminalna hobotnica (2012)
Sluge tranzicije i komunizma: priča o krizi identiteta i komunističkoj diktaturi u BiH (2012)
Era terorizma u BiH (2007)
Moševac: što je bilo - bilo je (1989)

References

Sources

External links
In depth analysis of claims - Raskrinkavanje.ba

Living people
Bosnia and Herzegovina politicians
Bosniaks of Bosnia and Herzegovina
People from Maglaj
Experts on terrorism
Army of the Republic of Bosnia and Herzegovina soldiers
Year of birth missing (living people)